Megalara garuda, colloquially referred to as the "King of Wasps", is a large wasp and the only species in the genus Megalara, family Crabronidae, tribe Larrini. The species M. garuda is only known from the Mekongga Mountains in the southeastern part of the Indonesian island of Sulawesi. It was described in 2012 by Lynn Kimsey, director of the Bohart Museum of Entomology and professor of entomology at the University of California, Davis, and Michael Ohl, curator and head of entomology at the Museum für Naturkunde, Berlin. Rosichon Ubaidillah from the Indonesian Institute of Sciences also contributed the discovery.

In March 2012, the full species description was published. The species is named after Garuda, the national symbol of Indonesia, a giant, bird-like creature. This species had never been observed while alive or in flight, nor had any raw footage of one alive ever been seen.

Their elongated mandibles are almost as long as their forelegs. Both sexes are shiny black with black wings. It is a solitary predator of other insect species. Very little is known about the sting of Megalara.

References 

Crabronidae
Apoidea genera
Monotypic Hymenoptera genera
Insects of Indonesia
Insects described in 2012